Tan Kheng Hua (born 17 January 1963) is a Singaporean actress. She is best known for her supporting role in the 2018 film Crazy Rich Asians and for the martial arts television series Kung Fu in 2021.

Career
Tan acquired an interest in acting when she took a theatre elective while attending Indiana University. After returning to Singapore, she took up a job in public affairs and acted in her spare time. She graduated with a Bachelor of Science (magna cum laude) from Indiana University School of Public & Environmental Affairs.

The first stage play Tan performed in was John Bowen's The Waiting Room, which was directed by her cousin Ivan Heng. It took almost a decade before Tan became a full-time actress.

In the theatre, Tan is in the original casts of landmark plays such as Beauty World, Lao Jiu, Descendants of the Admiral Eunuch, Animal Farm, Cooling Off Day and Falling, for which she won her second Life! Theatre Best Actress Award.

In television, Tan is best known for her role as Margaret in Singapore's longest running and most successful sitcom, Phua Chu Kang Pte Ltd, for which she won an Asian Television Award for Best Actress (Comedy). Her first foray into Mandarin-language television, Beautiful Connection, earned her a nomination at the Star Awards.

On the international scene, Tan appeared in Serangoon Road, Marco Polo and Crazy Rich Asians.

In 2020, Tan was cast as a series regular in Kung Fu, The CW's modern reboot of Kung Fu.

Tan also creates and produces for stage and television in Singapore including the critically acclaimed cabaret act, The Dim Sum Dollies; the dramas 9 Lives and Do Not Disturb, the latter being the first local TV series to receive the maximum 5-star rating from Straits Times Life!, the Mandarin serial, Mr & Mrs Kok and lifestyle infotainment on The Asian Food Channel.

Tan also creates and produces theatre and festivals outside of Singapore including No.7, an original theatre piece commissioned by the Georgetown Festival 2011 in Penang. No.7 was sold out with a waiting list. In 2014, she brought 64 Singaporean and Malaysian artists together in The SIN-PEN Colony to Penang's Georgetown Festival celebrating the cities’ shared heritage of food, visual art, music, theatre and design. The theatre segment within The SIN-PEN Colony, 2 Houses, sold-out within four days. She conceptualized and produced The Twenty-Something Theatre Festival 2016 and Tropicana The Musical which opened to rave reviews in April 2017.

For her contributions to the arts, Tan was one of fifty local stage personalities in an exhibition celebrating 50 years of Singapore theatre and part of twenty contemporary artists chosen to represent Singapore in Singapore: Inside Out, a showcase presented by the Singapore Tourism Board in Beijing, London and New York City to celebrate Singapore's fiftieth anniversary.

Personal life 
Tan married fellow theatre actor Lim Yu-Beng but later divorced. They have a daughter.

Filmography

Film

Television

Theatre

Practice Performing Arts: The Caucasian Chalk Circle by Bertold Brecht (emsemble, 1989)
Mad Forest by Caryl Churchill (Lucia, Dog, 1990)
TheatreWorks: Trojan Women by Euripides (Andromeda, 1991)
Lao Jiu by Kuo Pao Kun (ensemble, Perth Festival 1994)
Music & Movement: Kampong Amber by Catherine Lim (May, lead, opening show Singapore Arts Festival 1994)
Longing (ensemble, outdoor performance) (1994)
Broken Birds (ensemble, outdoor performance, 1995)
Theatreworks: Descendants of the Admiral Eunuch by Kuo Pao Kun (ensemble, winner Critics Award Best Acting Ensemble Cairo International Festival for Experimental Theatre, 1996)
TheatreWorks: Beauty World (Lulu, lead, South East Asian Theatre Festival and Tokyo International Theatre Festival in Japan) (1998)
Fiction Farm: The Blue Room by David Hare (Au Pair, Model, 1999)
Toy Factory: Guys & Dolls by Damon Runyon (Sarah Brown, 1999)
Closer by Patrick Marber (Anna, 2000)
Action Theatre: Autumn Tomyam by Desmond Sim (Marge Lerner, 2001)
Mergers & Accusations by Eleanor Wong (Ellen Toh, 2001)
Wills & Secession by Eleanor Wong (Ellen Toh, 2001)
Wild Rice: Animal Farm adapted by Ian Wooldridge (Clover, 2002)
Invitation To Treat – The Eleanor Wong Trilogy by Eleanor Wong (2003)
Luna-Id: The Lover by Harold Pinter (Sarah, 2004)

Awards and nominations
Art Nation Best Actress Award (2003)
DBS Life! Theatre Award, Best Actress (2002),
Asian Television Award, Best Comedic Performance by an Actress (2002),
Asian Television Award Highly Commended Performance by an Actress (2003),
Star Awards (Mandarin) Nominated Best Supporting Actress (2002),
Asian Television Award Runner-up Best Current Affairs & Magazine Presenter (2000),
JCCI Singapore Foundation Culture Awards for Contributions to Singapore (1998),
Critics Choice for Best Actor Cairo International Festival of Experimental Theatre (1997), *Indiana University Founders Day Award for High Scholastic Achievement (1984, 1985, 1986), *National Colours Awards for Gymnastics (1977) (Noteworthy Selections: 21 Remarkable Women of *Singapore by the Association of Women for Action and Research (Aware))

External links

References

1963 births
Living people
Singaporean people of Hokkien descent
Singaporean people of Teochew descent
Singaporean stage actresses
Singaporean film actresses
Singaporean television personalities
Singaporean television actresses
Catholic Junior College alumni
Indiana University alumni
20th-century Singaporean actresses
21st-century Singaporean actresses